Clasen is a German surname. Notable people with the surname include:

Alvin J. Clasen (1892-1971), American politician
Daniel Clasen (1622–1678), German political theorist, religious scholar, and classicist
Helmut Clasen (born 1935), German-born Canadian motorcycle racer
Henry J. Clasen (1829-1907), American politician
Leo Clasen (born 1906), German Holocaust survivor

German-language surnames